James Carnes House, also known as "The Myrtles," is a historic home located at Bishopville, Lee County, South Carolina.  It was built about 1836, and is a two-story, Greek Revival style frame house.  It has a gable roof, weatherboard siding, brick foundation and stuccoed exterior end brick chimneys. The house features a large, two-story, pedimented portico on the front façade, with four larger square, frame columns with Doric order motif capitals. A large -story addition was added to the rear about 1900, when the house was made into a boarding house.

It was added to the National Register of Historic Places in 1986.

References

Houses on the National Register of Historic Places in South Carolina
Greek Revival houses in South Carolina
Houses completed in 1836
Houses in Lee County, South Carolina
National Register of Historic Places in Lee County, South Carolina
1836 establishments in South Carolina